Amlia is an island in the Aleutian Islands. It is located near the eastern end of the Andreanof Islands and is situated between Atka Island and Seguam Island.

It has a rough terrain and reaches  at its highest point. There is no permanent resident population. Amlia Island is the second-largest uninhabited island in the Aleutian Islands. Nearby islands include Agligadak, Sagigik and Tanadak.

References

Further reading
Amlia Island: Block 1084, Census Tract 1, Aleutians West Census Area, Alaska United States Census Bureau
Alaska Maritime National Wildlife Refuge (AMNWR)

Andreanof Islands
Uninhabited islands of Alaska
Islands of Unorganized Borough, Alaska
Islands of Alaska